Green Gulch may refer to:

Green Gulch Farm Zen Center, a Buddhist center near Muir Beach, California
Green Gulch mule deer migration corridor, a western Nevada area in the southern Peterson Mountain Range